Amiral Édouard Guillaud (born 10 July 1953) is a retired French Naval Officer and Admiral. He devoted a significant part of his career to the design of the Charles De Gaulle aircraft carrier, and eventually captained carrier de Gaulle. He served as Chief of the general staff headquarters of the Armies CEMA from 25 February 2010 to 2014.

Biography

Early life 

Édouard Guillaud is the son of journalist Jean-Louis Guillaud, former president of Agence France-Presse and TF1.

He studied at the Lycée Hector Berlioz in Vincennes and at the Private Lycée Sainte-Geneviève in Versailles.

Military career 

Édouard joined the École Navale in 1973. As an Enseigne de vaisseau (vessel Ensign), he first served on the patroller La Paimpolaise from 1976 to 1978, monitoring the nuclear trials in Mururoa. Afterwards, he served consecutively for one year on two French nuclear ballistic missile submarines SNLE L'Indomptable and Le Redoutable, following which he took command in 1979 of the minesweeper Lobelia, for another year until 1980. The next year, he studied for a specialisation in gunnery and missiles.

In the early 1980s, Guillaud was sent in exchange in the United States (U.S.). As a Lieutenant de Vaisseau (Lieutenant) from 1981 to 1984, he then served as service chief on the aviso Amyot d'Inville and the squadron escorteurs launch missile Du Chayla, then as a service operations chief on the squadron escorteur launch missile Kersaint, cruising off the seas between Iran and Lebanon in 1983.

From 1984 to 1987, he worked on the nuclear aircraft carrier programme, particularly on expert systems in the programming environment of the ship. He was promoted to Capitaine de corvette in 1985.

In 1987 he took command of the BATRAL Dumont d'Urville for one year, taking part in the operations related to the Ouvéa cave hostage taking on Ouvéa, New Caledonia.

Guillaud went on to study at the Superior Naval War School and the School of Military Application for Atomic Energy, rising to Capitaine de frégate in 1989. He specialised in nuclear engineering, obtaining a degree in 1990.

In 1991, with the start of the Gulf War, Guillaud was sent on the Clemenceau, where he served as a Maneuver Officer.

In 1992, he took command of the aviso-escort Enseigne de vaisseau Henry (F749). In 1993, he re-integrated the design team for the nuclear carrier. Guillaud was promoted to Capitaine de vaisseau in 1996. The following year, he took the position of second officer on the Charles De Gaulle, which was then being completed in Brest.

From 1999 to 2001, Guillaud captained the nuclear carrier Charles De Gaulle, supervising carrier de Gaulle's trials and fittings. The next year, he studied at the Centre des hautes études militaires CHEM and at the Institut des hautes études de Défense nationale IHEDN.

Admiral 

From 2002 to 2004, he served as the assistant chief to the navy of the Chief of the Military Staff of the President of the Republic.

Between 2004 and 2006, Contre-Amiral (Counter-Admiral) Guillaud was préfet maritime for the English Channel and the North Sea. He was promoted to Vice-Amiral (Vice-Admiral) on 1 April 2006. The same year, he was called by Jacques Chirac to take on the position of Chief of the Military Staff of the President of the Republic CEMP-P.R., replacing General Georgelin; Guillaud took the office on 4 October, and was confirmed in this role in May 2007 after the election of Nicolas Sarkozy. As a Vice-amiral d'escadre (Squadron vice-admiral), he was promoted to Amiral (Admiral) in December 2007.

Guillaud has taken office as chief of the general staff headquarters of the Armies CEMA on 25 February 2010, and is the second Admiral of France to take this post.

Since 19 March 2011, he has commanded the French forces enforcing the Libyan no-fly zone.

In 2013 he commanded the French Forces in the Mali Civil War.

He left active duty service on 14 February 2014 when général Pierre de Villiers succeeded him at head of the armies. He assumed a French armament directorate until 2017.

Decorations and medals 

Honorary Corporal of the French Foreign Legion.

See also 

Benoit Puga
List of Escorteurs of the French Navy
List of submarines of France
Christophe Prazuck
Bernard Rogel
Pierre-François Forissier

Sources and references 

1953 births
Living people
French Navy admirals
École Navale alumni
Military personnel from Paris
Grand Officiers of the Légion d'honneur
Officers of the Ordre national du Mérite
Officers of the Ordre du Mérite Maritime
Recipients of the Aeronautical Medal
Commanders of the Legion of Merit
Recipients of the Order of Naval Merit (Brazil)
Honorary Knights Commander of the Order of the British Empire
Grand Crosses of the Order of Merit of the Republic of Poland
Commanders of the Order of Isabella the Catholic
Recipients of the Order of Merit 1st Grade (Lebanon)
Grand Officers of the National Order of Mali
Recipients of the Order pro Merito Melitensi
Chief of the Defence Staff (France)